The Angel Song is the debut album by Ezio, released in 1993. The album, named after the closing song, was self-released by the band and the proceeds from sales of the album at gigs were used to fund further touring.

Track listing

All songs written by Ezio Lunedei except as indicated.

"Moonstruck" – 4:21 (Music by Ezio, lyrics by Ezio and Paul Howard)
"Cinderella" – 5:35
"Immigrants table" – 3:15
"Thousand years" – 3:45
"Go"  - 5:13 
"If you want" – 3:49
"Circus" – 4:13
"Steal away" – 3:45
"Francesca's grown up" – 5:02
"Agony" – 2:49
"Just because you're near" – 3:43 
"The Angel song" – 5:14

Credits 
Ezio – guitar, vocals
Booga – guitar
Mark Gillespie – bass
Richard Beasley – drums
Martin Randle – keyboards

Production
Producer: Ezio
Engineering: Mark Gillespie and Steve Bottomley
Cover illustration: Giovanna Pierce
Sleeve design: Nick

1993 debut albums
Ezio (band) albums